Extended Play Remixes is an EP by then-teenage Christian pop and rock singer/songwriter Rebecca St. James. It was released on 20 July 1995, and contains remixes of three of her songs from the album Rebecca St. James.

The EP was released on Forefront Records (catalog 5126).<ref name="Drodge">Drodge, Dave (1 April 1996). "Rebecca St. James - Remixes". Cross Rhythms Magazine. Issue 32.</ref>  Upon its release in the UK in 1996, Cross Rhythms Magazine reviewer Dave Drodge wrote that the first three tracks were "good, if ... sugary", with a "successful trance feel" on two of them. He found "Everything I Do" highly danceable while retaining the lyrics: "very good." Drodge subtracted a point for the EP's price being higher than the import version, giving a total score of six "boxes" out of ten.

Track listing
"Side By Side" (Brothers Keeper Extended Remix) – 6:54
"Side By Side" (Trance Phonix Mix) – 5:38
"Side By Side" (Youtherial Mix) – 3:58
"We Don't Need It" (9070 Classic Mix) – 4:50
"Everything I Do" (Down Under Dub) – 5:50

See alsoExtended Play Remixes'', for other EPs of the series

References

1995 EPs
1995 remix albums
ForeFront Records EPs
ForeFront Records remix albums
Rebecca St. James albums
Remix EPs